Semophylax is a genus of moth in the family Gelechiidae.

Species
 Semophylax apicepuncta (Busck, 1911)
 Semophylax verecundum (Omelko, 1988)

References

Gelechiinae